A. A. M. Mesbahul Haq was a Bangladesh Awami League politician and the former Member of Parliament of Rajshahi-3. He was awarded an Ekushey Padak in 2020, posthumously.

Career
Haq was elected to parliament from Rajshahi-3 as a Bangladesh Awami League candidate in 1973.

References

Awami League politicians
1st Jatiya Sangsad members
Recipients of the Ekushey Padak